Blues Cross Country is a 1962 studio album by Peggy Lee, principally arranged by Quincy Jones, with some arrangements by Benny Carter. The album can be described as a concept album, consisting of a musical journey across the United States through swinging blues songs, many of which were written by Lee with other contributors.

Blues Cross Country was the second of Lee's two albums featuring arrangements by Jones. He had also arranged her previous studio album, If You Go (1961).

Reception

Blues Cross Country received good reviews at the time of its release from both Billboard magazine in March 1962, and Time magazine in May 1962. Billboard wrote that "Peggy's back, and this time in a blues mood - with sad blues, happy blues and swinging blues. She sings them in her own delightful style aided muchly by the fine arrangements of ork [sic] leader Quincy Jones. .. The album's a gas".

The Allmusic review by William Ruhlmann awarded the album four stars and commented that "Though Jones' arrangements are often a touch brassier than the blues standards can handle, Lee contributes just the right blend of vigor and feeling to the songs"

Track listing 
 "Kansas City" (Jerry Leiber, Mike Stoller) - 2:29
 "Basin Street Blues" (Spencer Williams) - 3:04
 "Los Angeles Blues" (Peggy Lee, Quincy Jones) - 2:38
 "I Lost My Sugar in Salt Lake City" (Johnny Lange, Leon Rene) - 2:53
 "The Grain Belt Blues" (Lee, Milt Raskin, Bill Schugler) - 1:52
 "New York City Blues" (Jones, Lee) - 3:21
 "Goin' to Chicago Blues" (Count Basie, Jimmy Rushing) - 2:37
 "San Francisco Blues" (Lee, Raskin) - 2:37
 "Fisherman's Wharf" (Lee, Raskin) - 3:11
 "Boston Beans" (Lee, Raskin, Schugler) - 2:05
 "The Train Blues" (Jones, Lee) - 2:42
 "Saint Louis Blues" (W. C. Handy) - 2:15
Bonus tracks issued on the 1999 CD release
"Hey, Look Me Over!" (Cy Coleman, Carolyn Leigh) - 1:55
 "The Shining Sea" (Lee, Johnny Mandel) - 2:45

Personnel 
 Peggy Lee - vocals
 Quincy Jones - arranger, conductor
 Benny Carter - arranger, alto saxophone, tuba
 Stan Levey, Earl Palmer - drums
 Max Bennett - bass guitar
 Chico Guerrero - congas, percussion
 Aubrey Bouck, Bill Henshaw, Sinclair Lott, Henry Sigismonti - French horn
 Frank Strazzeri - piano  
 Toots Thielemans - guitar
 Jimmy Rowles - piano  
 Bob Cooper, Harry Klee, Bud Shank - woodwind
 Bill Green, Plas Johnson, Bill Perkins - alto saxophone, tenor saxophone
 Jack Sheldon - trumpet
 Dennis Budimir - guitar
 Bob Bain, John Pisano, Howard Roberts - guitar
 Artie Kane - electronic organ
 Larry Bunker, Emil Richards - percussion
 Lou Levy - piano
 Jack Nimitz - baritone saxophone
 Buddy Collette - alto saxophone, tenor saxophone
 Justin Gordon - tenor saxophone
 Hoyt Bohannon, Vern Friley, Bobby Knight, Lew McCreary, Dick Nash, George Roberts, Frank Rosolino, Tommy Shepard - trombone
 Pete Candoli, Bob Fowler, Conrad Gozzo, Joe Graves, Al Porcino, Ray Triscari - trumpet

References 

1962 albums
Albums arranged by Benny Carter
Albums arranged by Quincy Jones
Albums conducted by Quincy Jones
Albums produced by Milt Gabler
Blues albums by American artists
Capitol Records albums
Concept albums
Peggy Lee albums